David George Carlton (born 24 November 1952) is an English retired professional footballer who made 320 appearances as a midfielder in the Football League, most notably for Northampton Town and Brentford.

Playing career

Early years 
Carlton began his career as an apprentice at West Ham United and moved to Fulham in 1969. He made his debut during the 1971–72 Second Division season and made 8 appearances in total. After a loan spell at North American Soccer League club Dallas Tornado in 1972, Carlton returned to Fulham, but made just one further appearance before his departure in October 1973.

Northampton Town 
Carlton signed for Fourth Division club Northampton Town in October 1973. He made just six league appearances in what remained of 1973–74, but became a regular pick from the beginning of the 1974–75 season and helped the Cobblers to promotion to the Third Division a year later. Northampton Town were relegated straight back to the Fourth Division and Carlton departed the club early in the 1976–77 season. He made 104 league appearances and scored six goals during nearly three years at the County Ground.

Brentford 
Carlton reunited with his former Fulham and Northampton Town manager Bill Dodgin at Fourth Division club Brentford in October 1976 and signed for a £3,000 fee. He helped the Bees to promotion to the Third Division in the 1977–78 season and unlike with Northampton, the club consolidated its position at the higher level. Carlton departed Griffin Park at the end of the 1979–80 season and made 148 appearances and scored seven goals during nearly four years with the Bees.

Return to Northampton Town 
In September 1980, Carlton dropped back to the Fourth Division, when he followed Bill Dodgin back to Northampton Town. He made 76 league appearances before departing in 1982.

Wealdstone 
Carlton ended his career with a spell at Alliance Premier League club Wealdstone.

Personal life 
After retiring from football, Carlton settled in Little Billing and began a business selling golf equipment.

Career statistics

Honours 
Northampton Town

 Football League Fourth Division second-place promotion: 1975–76

Brentford

 Football League Fourth Division fourth-place promotion: 1977–78

References

1952 births
Footballers from Stepney
English footballers
Brentford F.C. players
English Football League players
West Ham United F.C. players
Fulham F.C. players
Dallas Tornado players
North American Soccer League (1968–1984) players
Association football midfielders
English expatriate footballers
Living people
English expatriate sportspeople in the United States
Northampton Town F.C. players
Wealdstone F.C. players
National League (English football) players
People from Billing, Northamptonshire